Colonel (Col) is a senior officer rank in the Sri Lanka Army that is a superior rank to lieutenant colonel and subordinate to Brigadier. The rank has a NATO rank code of OF-5, equivalent to captain in the Sri Lanka Navy and group captain in the Sri Lanka Air Force.

Colonel of the Regiment 
The title Colonel of the Regiment (to distinguish it from the military rank of colonel) continues to be used in the modern Sri Lanka Army. The ceremonial position is often conferred on retired general officers, brigadiers or colonels who have a close link to a particular regiment. When attending functions as "Colonel of the Regiment", the titleholder wears the regimental uniform with rank insignia of (full) colonel, regardless of their official rank. A Colonel of the Regiment is expected to work closely with a regiment and its Regimental Association.

Insignia 
The rank insignia for a colonel is a Sri Lanka emblem over two "pips".

Notable colonels 

 Colonel A.F. Lafir PWV, RWP, RSP  – Special Forces Regiment – recipient of the highest Sri Lankan military decoration, the Parama Weera Vibhushanaya 
 Colonel C. A. Dharmapala, OBE, ED – Gemunu Watch – Parliamentary Secretary to the Minister of Industries, Housing and Social Services and Member of Parliament for Hakmana. He also served as the permanent secretary to the Ministry of Defence, and as Security Adviser to President J. R. Jayewardene.
 Colonel Maurice de Mel – Chief of Staff of the Ceylon Army and Commandant of the Ceylon Volunteer Force.

See also
Sri Lanka Army ranks and insignia
Sri Lanka Navy rank insignia
Sri Lanka Air Force rank insignia
Sri Lanka Army
Military of Sri Lanka
Comparative military ranks
Military rank

References

Further reading

 Sri Lanka Army. (October 1999). "50 YEARS ON – 1949–1999, 1st edition.

External links 

 Sri Lanka Army
 Ministry of Defence, Public Security, Law & Order – Democratic Socialist Republic of Sri Lanka

Military ranks of the Sri Lanka Army
Sri Lankan colonels